Pierre Brannefors (1962-2019) was an international speedway rider from Sweden.

Speedway career 
Brannefors reached the final of the Speedway World Pairs Championship in the 1983 Speedway World Pairs Championship.

He rode in the top tier of British Speedway from 1981 to 1984, riding for King's Lynn Stars and Reading Racers. He was also the 1980 Swedish Junior Champion.

World Final appearances

World Pairs Championship
 1983 -  Göteborg, Ullevi (with Jan Andersson) - 5th - 16pts (4)

References 

1962 births
2019 deaths
Swedish speedway riders
King's Lynn Stars riders
Reading Racers riders
Sportspeople from Szeged